Paolo Sammarco (born 17 March 1983) is an Italian football coach and a former player who played as a midfielder. He is the caretaker head coach of Serie D club Ambrosiana.

Club career

Chievo
A product of European giants A.C. Milan's youth system, Sammarco never played a game for the side, serving consecutive loans: from 2002–04 in Serie C1, and from 2004–07 with first division side A.C. ChievoVerona. Cheivo also purchased half of the registration rights for €1.1 million (Martino Olivetti plus €100,000) in June 2003. In June 2006 Milan bought back Sammarco for undisclosed fee, with Olivetti moved back to Chievo for €250,000.

Sampdoria
On 22 June 2007, U.C. Sampdoria announced Sammarco, in another co-ownership deal with Milan, for €1.5 million fee and a reported €400,000 wage. In Sampdoria, he broke through, playing almost every league game in a team that achieved UEFA Cup qualification, under coach Walter Mazzarri.

In June 2008, Sampdoria gained full ownership of Sammarco for another €2.5 million, made his valued increased to €4 million (made Milan register a financial income of €1 million as the half retained had increased from €1.5 million to €2.5 million) Sammarco also signed a new contract which lasted until 30 June 2013 during 2009–10 season. On 25 August 2009 he was loaned to Udinese for one season, for a reported wage of €250,000. Sammarco was a sub under Luigi Delneri at the first match of 2009–10 Serie A.

On returning to Sampdoria for the beginning of the 2010–11 season, he did not appear in any games, as the club now hired Domenico Di Carlo as coach. However, his wage was increased to €700,000. He was loaned to Cesena on 30 December 2010 for the rest of the season.

He scored a goal in the first two games of 2011–12 Coppa Italia for Doria, however on 24 August he returned to Chievo in exchange with Simone Bentivoglio, re-uniting Di Carlo. Sammarco's wage was also reduced to €250,000 again.

Spezia
On 9 August 2012 he joined Spezia Calcio.

Frosinone 
On 21 January 2015 Sammarco was signed by Frosinone. He scored his first goal in Serie A for the club on 28 October 2015 in a 2–1 defeat of Carpi.

Virtus Verona
On 15 October 2019 he joined Serie C club Virtus Verona until the end of the season.

Serie D
On 12 August 2020 he moved to Arzignano.

International career
Sammarco was first capped for the Italy national under-21 football team in August 2005, against France, and was part of the final squad in the 2006 European Championship, making three appearances as a starter.

Coaching career
On 23 November 2021, he was appointed caretaker manager by Serie D club Ambrosiana, after joining the club as an assistant coach in the summer of 2021.

Footnotes

References

External links
 National team stats at FIGC.it
 Player Profile

1983 births
Sportspeople from Como
Footballers from Lombardy
Living people
Italian footballers
Italy under-21 international footballers
Italy youth international footballers
Association football midfielders
A.C. Milan players
A.C. Prato players
A.C. ChievoVerona players
U.C. Sampdoria players
A.C. Cesena players
Udinese Calcio players
Spezia Calcio players
Frosinone Calcio players
F.C. Arzignano Valchiampo players
Serie A players
Serie B players
Serie C players
Italian football managers
Serie D managers